Clinical Ethics is a quarterly peer-reviewed academic journal that covers medical ethics, clinical ethics, bioethics and medical law. The editor-in-chief is Jonathan Lewis (University of Manchester). It was established in 2006 and is published by SAGE Publications.

Abstracting and indexing 
The journal is abstracted and indexed in PubMed and Scopus.

References

External links 
 

SAGE Publishing academic journals
English-language journals
Bioethics journals
Quarterly journals
Publications established in 2006